Rogue Male is a 1976 British television film starring Peter O'Toole, based on Geoffrey Household's 1939 novel Rogue Male. Made by the BBC, it was adapted by Frederic Raphael, directed by Clive Donner and also stars Alastair Sim, John Standing and Harold Pinter. It was first broadcast on 22 September 1976.

Plot
In early 1939, before the start of the Second World War, Sir Robert Hunter (O'Toole) takes aim at Adolf Hitler with a hunting rifle, but hesitates to shoot and is spotted and tackled by a Schutzstaffel (SS) guard. Captured and tortured by the Gestapo, he claims that his aiming at Hitler was simply an intellectual exercise, to see if it could be done. Because of his high status in Britain, his captors intend to shoot him and cover it up as a hunting accident, but, because his body displays clear evidence of torture, they decide instead to throw him off of a cliff to disguise the signs.

However, Hunter survives the fall, and, with the aid of a German fisherman and a friendly sailor, makes his way back to England. He soon discovers that the German agents are after him, and that the Nazi government has requested his extradition. After killing a pursuer by electrocuting him on the London Underground, Sir Robert, now a fugitive, goes underground in rural England to escape his pursuers. It is revealed through flashbacks that his girlfriend, who played a role in organizing the German Resistance, was executed by the Nazi government.

Hunter's lead pursuer, an English Nazi sympathizer named Major Quive-Smith, successfully tracks him to his lair and traps him within it. Rather than kill Hunter, Quive-Smith offers to spare his life if he signs a false confession stating that he attempted to assassinate Hitler on behalf of British intelligence. Over the course of several days, Hunter constructs a rudimentary crossbow, lures Quive-Smith into looking down his breathing hole, and shoots him in the head, killing him.

Soon afterwards, Britain declares war against Germany, and Hunter, now with his status restored, agrees to discuss with the Admiralty about a secret mission (heavily implied to be a second attempt on Hitler's life).

Cast
 Peter O'Toole as Sir Robert Hunter
 John Standing as Major Quive-Smith
 Alastair Sim as The Earl
 Harold Pinter as Saul Abrahams
 Michael Byrne as Interrogator
 Mark McManus as Vaner
 Ray Smith as Fisherman
 Hugh Manning as Peale
 Robert Lang as Jessel
 Cyd Hayman as Rebecca
 Ian East as Muller
 Philip Jackson as 1st Seaman
 Nicholas Ball as 2nd Seaman
 Maureen Lipman as Freda
 Ray Mort as Gerald
 Michael Sheard as Hitler
 Shirley Dynevor as Eva Braun
 Ivor Roberts as Drake
 John Ringham as SS Officer

Background
The novel had been filmed in 1941 by Fritz Lang, as Man Hunt, with Walter Pidgeon in the lead role.

According to producer Mark Shivas, script editor Richard Broke had the idea of making six TV movie thrillers for the BBC which showed the changing nature of the British hero from 1918 to 1939, with Rogue Male to be the last. Shivas was then working on an adaptation of The Glittering Prizes with writer Frederic Raphael and commissioned him to adapt Rogue Male. Raphael went back to the novel and ignored the 1941 film. Shivas felt there were three things any version of Rogue Male had to have, the attempted assassination of Adolf Hitler at the beginning of the story, the chase on the London Underground and the battle underground at the end. Filming took 25 days and involved 29 locations. Shivas would make two others in the series, She Fell Among Thieves and The Three Hostages.

Interviewed by the Radio Times for the first screening of the film, Household acknowledged that he always intended the protagonist's target to be Hitler, "Although the idea for Rogue Male germinated from my intense dislike of Hitler, I did not actually name him in the book as things were a bit tricky at the time and I thought I would leave it open so that the target could be either Hitler or Stalin. You could take your pick".

It was reported that Peter O'Toole had agreed to be cast in Rogue Male partly because the original novel was a favourite of his wife Sian Phillips.

Production
Some of the filming took place around King's Stag in Dorset, including the area around a local pub, The Fox Inn, Court Hill, Corscombe in Dorset.
As a TV production, the film was made on a relatively tight budget and the crew was paid at the lower rates applicable to TV productions.

Release and reception 
Despite its low budget, the finished film was regarded by the BBC as being suitable for a cinema release internationally. This had the potential to cause legal and industrial problems in the UK, because the crew had not been paid at the rate applicable to cinema releases.  The BBC decided to terminate screenings in the UK and disallow future screenings in the UK. In an interview with Francine Stock for BBC Radio 4's Film Programme in 2007, Peter O'Toole named the film as his favourite among those that he had made.

References

External links
 

1976 television films
1976 films
British television films
BBC television dramas
Films about assassinations
Films based on British novels
Films directed by Clive Donner
Films scored by Christopher Gunning
Cultural depictions of Adolf Hitler
Films set in Germany
1970s English-language films